Year 1277 (MCCLXXVII) was a common year starting on Friday (link will display the full calendar) of the Julian calendar.

Events 
 By place 

 Byzantine Empire 
 March 19 – Byzantine–Venetian Treaty: Emperor Michael VIII (Palaiologos) concludes an agreement with the Republic of Venice. Stipulating a two-year truce, and renewing Venetian commercial privileges in the Byzantine Empire. Michael keeps the Venetians and their fleet from participating in the attempts of Charles I, king of Sicily, to organize an anti-Byzantine crusade, while the Venetians can retain their access to the Byzantine market.
 Battle of Pharsalus: Michael VIII (Palaiologos) sends a Byzantine expeditionary army under John Synadenos to invade Thessaly. The Byzantines are ambushed and defeated by Greek forces under John I (Doukas), Latin ruler of Thessaly, near Pharsalus (or Old Pharsalus). During the battle, Synadenos is captured and Michael Kaballarios, commander of the Latin mercenaries, dies shortly afterward of his wounds. 
 Summer – Uprising of Ivaylo: A uprising under Ivaylo breaks out in northeastern Bulgaria against Emperor Constantine I Tikh to cope with the constant Mongol invasions which devastated the country for years. He confronts and defeats the plundering Mongols, and by autumn all Mongols are driven out of Bulgarian territory. In return, Constantine gathers a small army and tries unsuccessfully to suppress the revolt.

 Europe 
 January 21 – Battle of Desio: Lombard forces under Archbishop Ottone Visconti defeat the Della Torre family troops for the rule of Milan. Later, Ottone enters the city in triumph, and imprisons Napoleone della Torre in the Castello Baradello at Como (Northern Italy). 
 March – Siger of Brabant, Dutch teacher and philosopher, is condemned by the French Inquisition for his advocacy of the Averroist doctrine that reason is separate from Christian faith. 
 March 18 – Charles I, king of Sicily, buys the title to the Kingdom of Jerusalem from Maria of Antioch, for 1,000 bezants and an annual payment of 4,000 livres tournois.
 May 12 – Mehmet I of Karaman, Seljuk vizier, issues a firman (decree) ordering the Turkish language to be used, instead of Arabic or Persian in government offices.
 August – Marinid forces led by Sultan Abu Yusuf cross the Strait of Gibraltar and marches north, ravaging the districts of Jerez de la Frontera, Seville and Córdoba.

 England 
 November 10 – Treaty of Aberconwy: Prince Llywelyn ap Gruffudd and Edward I (Longshanks) sign a peace treaty which leaves Llywelyn only with the western part of Gwynedd.
 Roger Bacon, Franciscan friar and University of Oxford lecturer, is arrested for spreading anti-Church views; specifically, the Church's stance on Greek philosopher Galen.

 Levant 
 April 15 – Battle of Elbistan: A Mamluk army (some 14,000 men) under Sultan Baibars marches from Syria into the Mongol-dominated Sultanate of Rum and attacks the Mongol occupation force at Elbistan. Baibars, with at least 10,000 horsemen, defeats and overwhelms the Mongol forces. After the battle, he marches unopposed to Kayseri in the heart of Anatolia in triumph and enters the city on April 23.

 Asia 
 Battle of Ngasaunggyan: A Burmese army (some 80,000 men) led by King Narathihapate (or Sithu IV) invades  Mongol territory in Yunnan. The invasion is repelled by the Mongol forces, who counterattack, reaching as far south as the fortress city of Kaungsin ("Gold Teeth"), which guards the Bhamo Pass in northern Myanmar. Later, the Burmese Pagan Empire begins to disintegrate after several Mongol invasions under Kublai Khan.
 Migration of the (Southern) Song Dynasty: Some 50,000 citizens of the Song Dynasty in China become the first recorded inhabitants of Macau, as they seek refuge from the invading armies of the Yuan Dynasty. They also stay for a short period in Kowloon (or New Kowloon).
 In Japan, a 20 kilometer stone wall defending the coast of Hakata Bay at Fukuoka on the island of Kyushu is completed; it is built in response to the attempted invasion by the Mongol Yuan Dynasty (see 1274).

 By topic 

 Religion 
 March 7 – Condemnation of 1277: Pope John XXI instructs Étienne Tempier, bishop of Paris, to investigate the complaints of theologians in France. By order 219 propositions of philosophical and theological doctrines such as Averroism are prohibited from discussion in the University of Paris, under a decree promulgated by Tempier.
 April – John XXI sends a papal embassy to Constantinople to force Michael VIII (Palaiologos), his 18-year-old son and heir Andronikos, and Patriarch John XI Bekkos, to reaffirm their allegiance to the Union of Lyon in the Palace of Blachernae. Michael refuses to accept a religious union of the Greek Orthodox Church with Rome. 
 May 20 – John XXI dies after an 8-month pontificate at Viterbo. He is succeeded by Nicholas III as the 188th pope of the Catholic Church (until 1280).

Births 
 January 7 – Kanzan Egen, Japanese monk (d. 1360)
 January 21 – Galeazzo I, Italian nobleman (d. 1328)
 March 26 – Christina Ebner, German mystic (d. 1356)
 April 17 – Michael IX, Byzantine emperor (d. 1320)
 Akamatsu Enshin, Japanese governor (shugo) (d. 1350)
 Bernard V, German bishop (House of Lippe) d. 1341) 
 George I Šubić of Bribir, Croatian nobleman (d. 1302)
 Gerhard IV, German nobleman and knight (d. 1323)
 Ingeborg Magnusdotter, queen of Denmark (d. 1319)
 Isabella of Mar, wife of Robert I (the Bruce) (d. 1296)
 Martha of Denmark, queen consort of Sweden (d. 1341)
 Meihō Sotetsu, Japanese Zen Buddhist monk (d. 1350)
 Smbat I (or Sempad), king of Cilician Armenia (d. 1310)
 Wei Yilin, Chinese physician and surgeon (d. 1347)

Deaths 
 January 12 – Philippe de Toucy, French nobleman
 January 17 – Chen Wenlong, Chinese general (b. 1232)
 February 14 – Ulrich von Güttingen, German abbot
 May 1 – Stefan Uroš I (the Great), king of Serbia
 May 14 – Nicholas I of Werle, German nobleman 
 May 20 – John XXI, pope of the Catholic Church
 July 1 – Baibars (or Abu al-Futuh), Mamluk sultan
 July 14 – Humbert of Romans, French friar and writer
 August 2 – Mu'in al-Din Parwana, Seljuk statesman
 September 29 – Balian of Arsuf, Cypriot nobleman
 October 17 – Beatrice of Falkenburg, German queen
 October 26 – Mastino I della Scala, Italian nobleman
 October 27 – Walter de Merton, bishop of Rochester
 December 21 – Al-Nawawi, Seljuk scholar (b. 1233) 
 December 13 – John I, German nobleman (b. 1242)
 Constantine I Tikh, Bulgarian nobleman and ruler
 Folke Johansson (Angelus), Swedish archbishop
 Frederick II, German nobleman (House of Isenburg)
 Frederick of Castile, Spanish prince (infante) (b. 1223)
 Guo Kan, Chinese general and politician (b. 1217)
 Jacopo da Leona, Italian secretary, jurist and poet
 Joachim Gutkeled, Hungarian nobleman and knight
 Licoricia of Winchester, English businesswoman
 Madog II ap Gruffydd, Welsh prince and nobleman
 Mehmet I of Karaman, Seljuk nobleman and vizier
 Muhammad I al-Mustansir, Hafsid sultan and writer
 Muhaqqiq al-Hilli, Persian scholar, poet and writer
 Paolo Navigajoso, Venetian nobleman (megadux)
 Philip of Sicily, king of Sardinia (House of Anjou) 
 Savakanmaindan, Malayan ruler of Tambralinga
 Simone Paltanieri, Italian archpriest and cardinal 
 Squarcino Borri (or Scarsini), Italian condottiero
 Ulrich of Strasburg, German monk and theologian 
 William of Saliceto, Italian scholar and physician

References